The Hon John Maclaurin, Lord Dreghorn  FRSE (15 December 1734 – 24 December 1796) was a Scottish advocate who rose to be a Senator of the College of Justice. In 1783 he was one of the founders of the Royal Society of Edinburgh. He was a prolific author on both legal and literary issues.

Life

He was born on 15 December 1734 the son of  Anne Stewart and the noted Scots mathematician, Colin Maclaurin. He was educated at the High School in Edinburgh 1745 to 1747 then studied law at the University of Edinburgh. He qualified as an advocate in 1756. Maclaurin lived in Dreghorn Castle near Colinton (just south of Edinburgh), acquired from the Home family.

In 1757, Maclaurin wrote The Philosopher's Opera, a ballad opera satirising the philosopher David Hume's enthusiasm for the Rev. John Home's popular play, Douglas (1756).

In 1781 he was matriculated as Clan Chief of the Clan MacLaurin with origin in Tiree, by the Court of the Lord Lyon King of Arms. Clan MacLaurin is considered a different lineage from the Balquhidder MacLarens. "In granting him (Major Donald MacLaren in 1957) the appropriate arms, with supporters, the Lord Lyon makes a distinction between the MacLarens of Balquhidder and Strathearn, and the MacLarens (MacLaurins)  of Tiree, whose arms and descent are, his Lordship holds, those of a different race" Sir Thomas Innes of Learney 1957, via Elizabeth Roads, LVO, FSA, AIH., Snawdoun Herald, Lyon Keeper of the Records, Court of the Lord Lyon King of Arms.

In 1788 he was created a Senator of the College of Justice and given the title Lord Dreghorn, after his family home.

In 1790 he entered a famous correspondence with Lord Monboddo regarding the exact location of Troy.

He died on 24 December 1796. He is buried in Greyfriars Kirkyard in central Edinburgh.

Publications

Apology for the Writers against the Tragedy of Douglas (1757)
Hampden (1757)
The Philosopher’s Opera (1757)
The Keekeiad (1760)
Considerations on the Right of Patronage (1766)
Consideration on the Nature and Origin of Literary Property (1767)
Essays in Verse (1769)
Observations on some Points of Law with a System of the Judicial Law of Moses (1769)
The Story of Zeyn Akasnam, Prince of Balsora (1770)
Arguments and Decisions in the High Court (1774)

Family

In 1762 he married Esther Cunningham (died 1780).

In fiction
John Maclaurin features as a character in James Robertson's novel, Joseph Knight (2003).

References

1734 births
1796 deaths
Scottish lawyers
Fellows of the Royal Society of Edinburgh
Alumni of the University of Edinburgh
Senators of the College of Justice